The Sydney Sixers is an Australian cricket club who play in the Big Bash League, the national domestic Twenty20 competition. Along with cross-town rivals, Sydney Thunder, the club was established in 2011 as an inaugural member of the eight-club league. The Big Bash League consists of a regular season and a finals series of the top four teams. The two "Big finalists" earn the right to compete in the international Twenty20 tournament called the Champions League Twenty20 (CLT20). This list includes players who have played at least one match for the Sixers in the Big Bash League and the Champions League Twenty20.

Records

List of players

 

Source: ESPN.cricinfo Sixers Batting records and ESPN.cricinfo Bowling & Fielding records

See also
 Sydney Sixers
 Big Bash League
 Champions League Twenty20

References

Lists of Australian cricketers
Big Bash League lists
Sydney-sport-related lists